The 2004 Coca-Cola 600, the 45th running of the race, was a NASCAR Nextel Cup Series race held on May 30, 2004 at Lowe's Motor Speedway in Charlotte, North Carolina. Contested at 400 laps on the 1.5 mile (2.4 km) speedway, it was the twelfth race of the 2004 NASCAR Nextel Cup Series season. Jimmie Johnson of Hendrick Motorsports won the race, his second win of the season and also at Charlotte. Michael Waltrip finished second and Matt Kenseth finished third.

Failed to qualify: Steve Park ( 7), Todd Bodine (No. 37), Carl Long (No. 46), Stanton Barrett (No. 94), Geoffrey Bodine (No. 98), Morgan Shepherd (No. 89), Jeff Fultz (No. 78), Kirk Shelmerdine (No. 72), Andy Hillenburg (No. 80)

Background

Lowe's Motor Speedway is a motorsports complex located in Concord, North Carolina, United States 13 miles from Charlotte, North Carolina. The complex features a 1.5 miles (2.4 km) quad oval track that hosts NASCAR racing including the prestigious Coca-Cola 600 on Memorial Day weekend and the Nextel All-Star Challenge, as well as the UAW-GM Quality 500. The speedway was built in 1959 by Bruton Smith and is considered the home track for NASCAR with many race teams located in the Charlotte area. The track is owned and operated by Speedway Motorsports Inc. (SMI) with Humpy Wheeler as track president.

Entry list

Qualifying

Race results

Race statistics
 Time of race: 4:12:10
 Average Speed: 
 Pole Speed: 187.052
 Cautions: 7 for 37 laps
 Margin of Victory: under caution
 Lead changes: 16
 Percent of race run under caution: 9.2%         
 Average green flag run: 51.9 laps

References

Coca-Cola 600
Coca-Cola 600
NASCAR races at Charlotte Motor Speedway